Dusík, or its variant Dussek, is a Czech surname. Notable people with the surname include:

Jan Dusík (born 1975), Czech politician
Jan Ladislav Dussek (1760–1812), Czech composer and pianist
Joanna Dusik (born 1989), Polish skater
Katerina Veronika Anna Dusíkova (1769–1833), also known as Veronika Dussek, Czech composer and pianist, sister of J. L. Dussek
Olivia Buckley (1799–1847), also known as Olivia Dussek, English composer and harpist, daughter of J. L. Dussek
Sophia Dussek (1775 – c. 1831), also known as Sophia Corri, Scottish composer, soprano and harpist, wife of J. L. Dussek

See also
Dussek Campbell Ltd, formerly Dussek Brothers, British chemical company
Dušek (disambiguation)